Llanfairfechan Urban District was an urban district in Caernarfonshire from 1894 to 1974, when it was absorbed into the District of Aberconwy

Some more historical detail, and information on the archives, here .

Urban districts of Wales
Caernarfonshire